Betaki (also Romanized as Betakī, Bateki, Botkī, Bottakī, and Būtehki) is a village in Firuzabad Rural District, Firuzabad District, Selseleh County, Lorestan Province, Iran. At the 2006 census, its population was 357, in 75 families.

References 

Towns and villages in Selseleh County